Sarbjeet S Kumar (born July 14, 1947) is an American Surgeon, Inventor, Entrepreneur, Writer and a Republican Legislator, serving in the Tennessee House of Representativesfrom the 66th district, representing Robertson County. He is currently the Chairman of the House Insurance Committee. He has represented the 66th district since 2015.

Early career
Kumar immigrated to the United States from India in 1970, working in Miami, Florida from 1971 to 1977. In 1977, Kumar moved to Springfield, Tennessee, where he continued his career as a surgeon.

Dr. Kumar is also the inventor of the Kumar clamp in used in gall bladder surgeries.

Political career
In 2014, Kumar ran for the Tennessee House of Representatives' 66th District. This came after incumbent Representative Joshua Evans 
decided to run for the Tennessee Senate. Kumar won the Republican primary on August 7, 2014, with 43% of the vote. On November 4, 2014, Kumar won the General Election, he was unopposed.

Kumar was re-elected in 2016 and 2018.

Personal life
Kumar lives in Springfield, Tennessee, with his wife Linda, and has a daughter named Nina. He works at the NorthCrest Medical Center, and is a Sunday School teacher at a local Methodist Church.

References

American politicians of Indian descent
1947 births
Republican Party members of the Tennessee House of Representatives
Living people
21st-century American politicians
Indian emigrants to the United States
American surgeons
Asian conservatism in the United States